The East Anglia Array is a proposed series of offshore wind farms located around 30 miles off the east coast of East Anglia, in the North Sea, England. It has begun with the currently operational East Anglia ONE, that has been developed in partnership by ScottishPower Renewables and Vattenfall. Up to six individual projects could be set up in the area with a maximum capacity of up to 7.2 GW. The first project, East Anglia ONE at 714 MW, received planning consent in June 2014 and contracts in April 2016. Offshore construction began in 2018 and the project was commissioned in July 2020. It is expected to cost £2.5 billion.

Planning
The East Anglia Zone is in the North Sea off the east coast of East Anglia. It is one of nine offshore zones belonging to the Crown Estate which formed part of the third licence round for UK offshore wind farms. At the closest point the zone is 14 km from shore. East Anglia Offshore Wind (EAOW) is a partnership between ScottishPower Renewables and Vattenfall. In December 2009, EAOW was announced as the developer for the East Anglia Zone.

The target capacity for the entire East Anglia Zone is 7200 MW which could require up to 1200 turbines. Up to six individual projects could be set up in the area. The first project is the East Anglia ONE windfarm, which was commissioned in July 2020. EAOW has planning permission granted for East Anglia THREE, and has announced plans for further projects named East Anglia TWO and East Anglia ONE North. If consents are received, all three new arrays will be built as a hub, combining to provide a rated capacity of 3.1GW of electricity from 263 wind turbines.

East Anglia ONE
East Anglia ONE is located in the southern area of the East Anglia Zone, and is approximately 43 km (27 miles) from the shore. The initial proposal was for an installed capacity of 1200 MW. Cabling for East Anglia ONE lands near the River Deben at Bawdsey, runs north of Ipswich and is connected to the National Grid at Bramford. 

A plan was formally submitted to the government in December 2012, and planning consent was granted in June 2014. In October 2014 ScottishPower announced that it intended to scale down East Anglia ONE because of insufficient subsidies. In February 2015 it was announced that ScottishPower would proceed with a scaled-down 714 MW project.

A contract for £119/MWh was published on 27 April 2016, using 102 Siemens Wind Power gearless turbines of 7 MW each. Nacelles were built in Cuxhaven, while blades were made in Hull. Due to water depths between 30-40 m, the turbines use jacketed foundations. Cabling is at 66 kV as opposed to the traditional 33 kV. Two export cables at 220 kV AC send the power to shore. A support vessel is powered by used vegetable oil.

Construction

Onshore construction began in 2017, with offshore construction starting in 2018. The first foundation was completed in June 2018 and the first turbine was completed in June 2019. The windfarm's offshore substation was installed in August 2018.

First power was generated in September 2019, turbine installation was completed in April 2020, and commercial operation began in July 2020.

East Anglia TWO
The East Anglia TWO wind farm is proposed to be 31km off-shore from Lowestoft and to have a generating capacity of 900MW. It is planned to be ready by 2030.

East Anglia THREE
The proposed East Anglia THREE wind farm is located in the northern half of the East Anglia Zone, and is approximately 69 km (42 miles) from the shore. It is expected to provide an installed capacity of 1200 MW from up to 172 turbines.  Installation commenced in July 2022

East Anglia ONE North
 
The proposed East Anglia ONE North wind farm is located approximately 36km from Lowestoft and 42km from Southwold. The proposed development would have a generating capacity of up to 800MW.

References

External links

National Infrastructure Planning

Proposed wind farms in England
Offshore wind farms in the North Sea
Round 3 offshore wind farms
2020 establishments in England